Gerardo Bujanda Sarasola (25 August 1919 – 4 September 2019) was a Spanish politician who served as a Deputy between 1977 and 1982.

References

1919 births
2019 deaths
Members of the 1st Congress of Deputies (Spain)
Members of the constituent Congress of Deputies (Spain)
Basque Nationalist Party politicians
Spanish military personnel of the Spanish Civil War (Republican faction)
Spanish centenarians
Men centenarians
Politicians from San Sebastián